Mohamed Bentiba (born October 21, 1989 in Oran) is an Algerian football player. He is currently playing for MC Oran in the Algerian Ligue Professionnelle 1.

International career
On, 2010, Bentiba was called up to the Algerian Under-23 National Team by the manager Azzedine Aït Djoudi.

References

External links
 

1989 births
Algerian footballers
Algerian Ligue Professionnelle 1 players
Algeria under-23 international footballers
Living people
MC Oran players
ASM Oran players
USM Alger players
Footballers from Oran
Association football forwards
21st-century Algerian people